The Gotland-class submarines of the Swedish Navy are modern diesel-electric submarines, which were designed and built by the Kockums shipyard in Sweden. They are the first submarines in the world to feature a Stirling engine air-independent propulsion (AIP) system, which extends their underwater endurance from a few days to weeks. This capability had previously only been available with nuclear-powered submarines.

Features
As of 2008, the Gotland-class attack submarine is one of the most modern submarines of the Swedish Navy in service, mainly designed for submarine missions such as antiship/antisubmarine warfare, collecting of intelligence (communications intelligence (COMINT), electronic signals intelligence (ELINT)), forward surveillance, special operations, and mine-laying tasks.

On the water surface, the submarine is powered by two sets of MTU engines. While submerged, the Kockums-built Stirling engine AIP system is used to drive a  generator for either propulsion or charging the batteries. A Stirling engine is particularly well suited for a submarine because the engine is nearly silent and can use the surrounding sea water as a heat sink to increase efficiency. Submerged endurance is dependent on the amount of liquid oxygen stored on-board and is described as "weeks". The class is characterized by its low acoustic signatures, extreme shock resistance, and a competent combat system.

Kockums touts extreme maneuverability for this class due to the hull design and a well-placed X rudder. The X rudder provides four control surfaces, along with two mounted on the sail, which enables sharp turns and the ability to operate very close to the seabed. Ship automation and computerized steering allow a single operator to steer the submarine in depth and course, which also results in a smaller crew complement, leading to good accommodation standards and low operating costs.

The class has many features that enhance stealth, helping it to remain undetected. All shipboard machinery is isolated and mounted on rubber dampeners to reduce vibrations and noises; a hydrodynamic hull design  reduces noise, infrared signature, and active sonar response. Its magnetic signature is counteracted by 27 independent electromagnets, short circuiting extremely low frequency (ELF) electrical fields. Various hull coatings reduce active sonar response, and the mast is coated with radar-absorbent material. Combined with the near-silent operation of the Stirling generator and slow-turning propeller to prevent cavitation, the boats are very difficult to detect under water, especially in their normal area of operations, the Baltic Sea.

Units

Deployments
After being refitted and upgraded to sustain the higher temperatures of tropical water, HSwMS Halland took part in a multi-national exercise in the Mediterranean from September 16, 2000. Allegedly, there she remained undetected while still recording many of her friendly adversaries, attracting interest from the participating countries. In early November the same year, she participated in a NATO "blue-water" exercise in the Atlantic. There, she reportedly won a victory in a mock "duel" with Spanish naval units, and then the same in similar duel against a French SSN, a nuclear-powered attack submarine. She also "defeated" an American SSN, the USS Houston.

Secondment to United States Navy

In 2004, the Swedish government received a request from the United States to lease HSwMS Gotland – Swedish-flagged, commanded and manned, for a duration of one year for use in antisubmarine warfare exercises. The Swedish government granted this request in October 2004, with both navies signing a memorandum of understanding on 21 March 2005. The lease was extended for another 12 months in 2006. In July 2007, HSwMS Gotland departed San Diego for Sweden.

In 2005, HSwMS Gotland managed to snap several pictures of  during a wargaming exercise in the Pacific Ocean, demonstrating that it was in a position to sink the aircraft carrier. The exercise was conducted to evaluate the effectiveness of the US fleet against  diesel-electric submarines, which some have noted as severely lacking. In 2001, during the exercise JTFEX 01-2 in the Caribbean Sea, the German U24 of the conventional 206 diesel-electric class "sank" the carrier Enterprise by firing flares and taking a photograph through its periscope.

Overhaul

Initial discussions 
In March 2013, Kockums received an initial order for an overhaul for two of the Gotland-class submarines. The overhaul was expected to be completed by 2017. With these upgrades, the submarines would be able to remain in active duty until after 2025.
On 2 April 2014, the Swedish defence minister, insisting on the importance of submarines to the security of Sweden, announced the Government's intent to upgrade two of the Gotland-class vessels, as well as purchase two new "stealth" submarines of another type.

Mid-life upgrade contract
Negotiations concluded on 30 June 2015 with the signature of a contract between Sweden's Defense Material Administration (FMV) and Saab Kockums. In addition to the construction of two new Type 26 A SSKs, the contract provides for a mid-life upgrade of HSwMS Gotland and her sister ship HSwMS Uppland, for SEK 2.1 billion. Gotland is expected to return to the FMV in late 2018 and Uppland in late 2019, following a series of platform and combat systems upgrades. Gotland returned to active duty in June 2018 after receiving modification for over 20 systems. Same systems will also be included on the new A26 submarines.  relaunched in June 2019 and was delivered to the Navy in December 2020. In March 2022 FMV and SAAB signed a contract for MLU of HMS Halland

See also
 List of submarine classes in service
 Coastal submarine

References

External links

Official Kockums website on Gotland class submarines 
Kockum's AIP Stirling system

 
Submarine classes
Naval ships of Sweden
Submarines of Sweden